Dolje may refer to:

Dolje, Slovenia
Dolje, a neighbourhood within the Podsljeme district of Zagreb, Croatia